The Tabnak gas field is an Iranian natural gas field that was discovered in 1967. It began production in 1980 and produces natural gas and condensates. The total proven reserves of the Tabnak gas field are around 30 trillion cubic feet (857×109m3) and production is slated to be around 1.5 billion cubic feet/day (43×106m3).

References

Natural gas fields in Iran